Peter Edward Lewis  is a retired British prosecutor, serving from 2007 until 2016 as the Chief Executive of the Crown Prosecution Service under the Director of Public Prosecutions. Since April 2018 he has been Registrar of the International Criminal Court.

Career
Lewis qualified as a solicitor in 1981, and started as a prosecutor in West Midlands Prosecuting Solicitors before joining the Crown Prosecution Service at its inception in 1986 when the police prosecutorial offices were merged into a single national body.

Appointed as Chief Executive in January 2007 to replace Richard Foster, Lewis was the first Chief Executive of the service to be appointed from within the ranks having started as a prosecutor. As of 2015, Lewis was paid a salary of between £160,000 and £164,999, making him one of the 328 most highly paid people in the British public sector at that time.

In February 2016, the CPS announced that Lewis would retire, and be replaced by Nick Folland from 16 March 2016.

Lewis was made a Companion of the Order of the Bath in the Queen's Birthday Honours 2012.

On 28 March 2018, he was elected Registrar to the International Criminal Court for a period of five years; and on 17 April, he was sworn in.

References

External links 
 A portrait of Lewis by the photographer Mark Thomas
 An interview with Lewis in 2011

Living people
British prosecutors
British civil servants
Registrars of the International Criminal Court
Year of birth missing (living people)